NGC 1501 is a complex planetary nebula located in the constellation of Camelopardalis, discovered in 27 Aug 1787 by William Herschel. It is also known as the Oyster Nebula.

Properties 
The central star of the planetary nebula has a spectral type of [WC4], similar to that of a carbon-rich Wolf–Rayet star. It is a pulsating star, meaning that its brightness varies regularly and periodically. In the case of NGC 1501's progenitor star, this is incredibly fast, with the star's brightness changing significantly in just half an hour. An analysis of Gaia data suggests that the central star is a binary system. Visible-light observations capture the glow of gases including hydrogen and nitrogen.

Gallery

References

External links

http://www.astronomy-mall.com/Adventures.In.Deep.Space/abellcat
http://www.observing.skyhound.com/archives/dec/NGC_1501

NGC 1501
Camelopardalis (constellation)
1501
Discoveries by William Herschel